Vinod  is a male given name used in India and Nepal, meaning "delight", "enjoyment", or "pleasure".

People

Vinod Agarwal, Indian-American businessman and scientist
Vinod Aggarwal, American economist and political scientist
Vinod Bala Arun, Indian academic
Vinod Kumar Bansal, Indian businessman
Vinod Kumar Baranwal, Indian judge
Vinod Bharathan, film director from Copenhagen
A. Vinod Bharathi, Indian cinematographer
Vinod Bhatia, Indian Air Force officer
Vinod Bhatt, Gujarati-language author
Vinod Bhayana, Indian politician
Vinod Kumar Binny, Indian politician
Vinod Kumar Boianapalli, Indian politician
Vinod Chaubey, Indian Police Service officer
Vinod Chohan, Tanzanian engineer at CERN
Vinod Dham, father of the Pentium chip
Vinod Dua, Indian television presenter and journalist
Vinod Kumar Duggal, Indian civil servant
Vinod Goenka, Indian businessman
Vinod Gupta, former CEO of infoGROUP
Vinod Johri, Indian astrophysicist
Vinod Jose, Indian journalist and editor
Vinod Joshi, Indian poet
Vinod K. Singh, Indian chemist
Vinod Kambli, Indian cricketer
Vinod Khanna, Indian film actor
Vinod Khosla, co-founder of Sun Microsystems
Vinod Kinariwala, Indian independence student-activist
Vinod Kovoor, Indian film actor
Vinod Krishan, Indian physicist
Vinod Kulkarni, Indian actor
Vinod Kumar, Indian film actor
Vinod Maharaj, Fiji-Indian politician
Vinod Mehra, Indian film actor
Vinod Mehta, Indian journalist and editor
Vinod C. Menon, former Chief of Emergency in UNICEF, India
Vinod Mishra, Indian politician
Vinod Nagpal, Indian film and television actor
Vinod Patel, Fiji-Indian businessman and politician
Vinod Patney, Indian Air Force officer
Vinod Phadke, Indian politician
Vinod Prakash Sharma, Indian scientist
Vinod Rai, former Comptroller and Auditor General of India
Vinod Raina, Indian educationist
Vinod Raj, Kannada film actor
Vinod Rams, American artist
Vinod Rathod, Bollywood playback singer
Vinod Saroj, Indian politician
Vinod Scaria, Indian scientist and biochemist
Vinod Sekhar, Malaysian businessman and philanthropist
Vinod Kumar Shukla, Hindi-language author
Vinod Kumar Shukla (politician), Indian businessman and politician
Vinod Singh (actor), Indian television actor
Vinod Kumar Sonkar, Indian politician
Vinod Sukumaran, Indian filmmaker
Vinod Tawde, Indian politician

Surname
Mahendra Chand Vinod, Fiji-Indian civil servant
P. S. Vinod, Indian cinematographer
Padmanath Bhattacharya Vidya Vinod, Indian historian

Stage name
Vinod (composer) (1922–1959), Indian film music director

Fictional characters
title character of Agent Vinod (1977 film)
title character of Agent Vinod (2012 film)
Vinod Chanda, from animated series Pantheon

See also

Vinoth
Binod

Indian masculine given names